Football Club Van, is an Armenian football club based in Charentsavan, Kotayk Province.

History
FC Van was founded on 31 May 2019 in the town of Charentsavan, Kotayk Province, by Armenian-Russian businessman Oleg Ghukasov. The club will take part in the 2019-20 Armenian First League season.

On 30 July 2020, it was announced that Van had been giving a license to compete in the Armenian Premier League for the 2020–21 season. On 31 July 2020, Vice-president Karen Barseghyan announced that he was stepping down as head coach to concentrate on being vice-president, with Sevada Arzumanyan being appointed as the club's new head coach. On 2 February 2021, Van announced that Konstantin Zaytsev had replaced Sevada Arzumanyan as their Head Coach.

Domestic

Current squad

Out on loan

For recent transfers, see Transfers summer 2022 and Transfers winter 2022–23.

Personnel

Management

Technical staff

Managerial history

References

Football clubs in Armenia
2019 establishments in Armenia
Association football clubs established in 2019
Sport in Kotayk Province